Timoci Volavola is a Fijian rugby union player. He has played in the Fiji rugby sevens side including the victorious IRB Sevens World Series Champions side of 2006. He has also played club rugby in Sydney, Australia with the Randwick club.

External links
Official website

Fijian rugby union players
Living people
Fijian expatriate rugby union players
Expatriate rugby union players in Australia
Fijian expatriate sportspeople in Australia
I-Taukei Fijian people
Year of birth missing (living people)